Guiraoa is a monotypic genus of flowering plants belonging to the family Brassicaceae. It only contains one species, Guiraoa arvensis Coss. 

It is native to Spain.

The genus name of Guiraoa is in honour of Ángel Guirao y Navarro (1817–1890), Spanish doctor, naturalist and politician from Murcia who discovered this plant. The Latin specific epithet of arvensis refers to arvum of ploughed fields or ploughed land.
It was first described and published in Notes Pl. Crit. on page 98 in 1851.

References

Brassicaceae
Brassicaceae genera
Flora of Spain
Plants described in 1851